is a Japanese figure skater. She is the 2023 Four Continents bronze medalist, 2022 JGP Poland I silver medalist, 2022 Egna Trophy bronze medalist, 2023 Coupe du Printemps champion, a two-time Japanese Junior medalist and two-time Challenge Cup junior champion.

Early life and education 
Chiba was born on 1 May 2005 in Sendai, Miyagi Prefecture, Japan. She attends Tohoku High School. Chiba   grew up idolizing Olympic gold medalist and Sendai hometown hero Yuzuru Hanyu; they met on the ice several times and he was "like a big brother" for her before he moved to Toronto, Canada to further his training.

Career

Early years 
Chiba began skating in 2010. She placed twenty-first at 2015–16 Japan Novice B Championships and twenty-ninth at 2016–17 Japan Novice A Championships. She made her first international appearance at the 2017 Asian Open in the advanced novice category and was first after the short program. In the free program, she downgraded a jump and had a fall. She finished in fifth place. Chiba placed sixth at 2017–18 Japan Novice A Championships.

Making her junior national championship debut at the 2018–19 Japan Junior Championships, Chiba finished in eighteenth place. The following year, she placed sixth at the 2019–20 Japan Junior Championships and was then invited to compete in the senior event because fourth place Momoka Hatasaki was still a novice skater. She finished in eighteenth place. In the junior category, she won the 2020 Challenge Cup.

2020–21 season 
She finished eighth place at the 2020–21 Japan Junior Championships and was invited to the 2020–21 Japan Championships, placing in twentieth there.

2021–22 season 
In light of the COVID-19 pandemic, the Japan Skating Federation opted not to send junior skaters out internationally in the fall of 2021. As a result, Chiba did not have the opportunity to compete on the Junior Grand Prix. At 2021–22 Japan Junior Championships, Chiba was seventh after the short. However, after a clean free program, she won the bronze medal behind Rion Sumiyoshi and Mao Shimada. She finished eleventh at the senior event.

Chiba was selected to 2022 Challenge Cup in the junior category and again won the competition. Two months later, she was sent to 2022 Egna Trophy, now competing in the senior category. Chiba got third place behind South Korea's Hae-in Lee and Japan's Hana Yoshida.

2022–23 season 
Chiba was initially scheduled to make her Junior Grand Prix debut at the Armenian stop on the 2022–23 circuit. However, that was cancelled as a result of the September conflict between Azerbaijan and Armenia, and skaters meant to attend were reassigned elsewhere. Instead, she debuted at the Junior Grand Prix event in Gdańsk, Poland. In her short program, she received an edge call on her combination but otherwise gave a clean skate, placing her first with a score of 70.16 points. During the free skate, Chiba landed all her jumps, albeit with a Lutz landed on a quarter. Chiba finished in second place behind Mao Shimada. At her second assignment, the 2022 JGP Italy, Chiba finished third in the short program, but dropped to fourth place after making several errors. She and was named the first of three alternates for 2022–23 Junior Grand Prix Final.

Appearing next at the 2022–23 Japan Junior Championships, Chiba won the silver medal behind Shimada. She then competed at the senior level, finishing a surprise third in the short program with a 71.06 score. She said that she "went into the short program with the frustration of last year," when she had finished eleventh in that segment. Chiba struggled in the free skate, coming seventh in that segment and dropping to fifth place overall. Despite being the third-highest-ranked senior-eligible qualifier, she was not assigned to compete at the 2023 World Championships, that going instead to Rinka Watanabe. She was assigned to compete at the 2023 Four Continents Championships.

At the Four Continents Championships in Colorado Springs, Chiba was seventh in the short program. However, a new personal best score in the free skate vaulted her into third overall, winning the bronze medal. Saying she had "never dreamed of getting a bronze medal," she assessed that "my skating maybe was not as grand as I would have liked it, but I am still satisfied."

Programs

Competitive highlights 
JGP: Junior Grand Prix

Detailed results 
Current personal best scores are highlighted in bold.

Senior level

Junior level

Novice level

References

External links 
 
 CHIBA Mone at the Japan Skating Federation

Japanese female single skaters
Living people
2005 births
Sportspeople from Sendai
Four Continents Figure Skating Championships medalists
21st-century Japanese women